Madolenihmw High School is a senior high school in Pohnlangas, Madolenihmw, Pohnpei Island, Pohnpei State, Federated States of Micronesia.  the school, operated by the Pohnpei State Department of Education, has about 400 students.

See also
 Education in the Federated States of Micronesia

References

Pohnpei
High schools in the Federated States of Micronesia